The 95th Boat Race took place on 26 March 1949. Held annually, the Boat Race is a side-by-side rowing race between crews from the Universities of Oxford and Cambridge along the River Thames in London.  The race, umpired by the former Oxford rower Guy Oliver Nickalls, was notable as the commentator for the BBC, John Snagge announced "I can't see who's in the lead, but it's either Oxford or Cambridge."  Cambridge won by a quarter of a length, the narrowest margin of victory since the 1877 race, which was officially recorded as a dead heat.  The victory took the overall record in the event to 51–43 in their favour.

Background

The Boat Race is a side-by-side rowing competition between the University of Oxford (sometimes referred to as the "Dark Blues") and the University of Cambridge (sometimes referred to as the "Light Blues").  First held in 1829, the race takes place on the  Championship Course on the River Thames in southwest London.  The rivalry is a major point of honour between the two universities; it is followed throughout the United Kingdom and, as of 2014, broadcast worldwide.  Cambridge went into the race as reigning champions, having won the 1948 race by five lengths, with Cambridge leading overall with 50 victories to Oxford's 43 (excluding the "dead heat" of 1877).

Cambridge were coached by R. Beesly (who had rowed for the Light Blues in the 1927, 1928 and 1929 races), W. L. S. Flemming, Mike Nicholson (non-rowing boat club president for the 1947 race), Harold Rickett (who had rowed three times between 1930 and 1932), and M. H. Warriner (a three-time Blue between 1928 and 1930).  Oxford's coaches were Hugh "Jumbo" Edwards (who had rowed for Oxford in 1926 and 1930), F. E. Hellyer (who had coached Cambridge on five previous occasions), A. McCulloch (who had rowed in the 1908 race) and J. MacNabb (who had coached Cambridge between 1930 and 1932).  The race was umpired by Guy Oliver Nickalls who had rowed for Oxford in the 1921, 1922 and 1923 races.

Writing in The Observer, G. I. F. Thomson noted that "neither crew contains an oarsman of any exceptional power, distinction or reputation" yet both crews had improved in form since their arrival at Putney.  The rowing correspondent for The Manchester Guardian praised the quality of the final coaching on the Thames, and stated that "there has been no threat of influenza, and no last-minute change in the constitution of either crew".  He went on to claim that "Oxford should win".  The Times rowing correspondent suggested that the crews were "extraordinarily evenly matched".

Crews
Oxford's crew contained five participants with prior Boat Race experience, including cox Alastair Palsgrave-Brown. Cambridge saw one rower return to the crew in number five Paul Bircher. The Light Blue's crew contained three Olympic medallists: Brian Lloyd, Bircher and Paul Massey won silver when they finished second in the men's eight at the 1948 Summer Olympics in London.

Race

Oxford won the toss and elected to start from the Middlesex station, handing the Surrey side of the river to Cambridge.  The umpire, Nickalls, started the race at 11:30 a.m. The Dark Blues took an early lead and were half a length ahead after the first minute of the race.  They were clear of Cambridge by Craven Steps, and by the time the crews passed the Mile Post, were a length ahead.  In the headwind along Chiswick Reach, and with the bend in the river in their favour, Cambridge slowly redressed the balance and by Chiswick Eyot they had begun to overlap Oxford's boat.

By the bottom of Dukes Meadows, Oxford's lead was down to half a length and as Cambridge out-rated their opponents, they drew level and passed under Barnes Bridge side by side.  Despite numerous spurts from Oxford's stroke Davidge, Cambridge kept in touch and "were fighting every inch of the way".  Commentating for the BBC on a launch whose engine had failed, John Snagge announced "I can't see who's in the lead, but it's either Oxford or Cambridge."  Both crews were rating over 33 strokes per minute as they approached the finishing post, with the Light Blues just edging ahead to win by a quarter of a length in a time of 18 minutes 57 seconds.  The winning distance was the narrowest since the "dead heat" result of the 1877 Race.  It was Cambridge's third consecutive victory and took the overall record in the event to 51–43 in their favour.  The rowing correspondent for The Manchester Guardian suggested that this was a race that "will never be forgotten", while the correspondent for The Times claimed that "1949 must go down in Boat Race history as having provided one of the epic struggles of all time." G. I. F. Thomson, writing in The Observer, stated that "heroic determination on both sides ... produced perhaps the most exciting Boat Race of all time."

References
Notes

Bibliography

External links
 Official website

1949 in English sport
1949 in rowing
The Boat Race
March 1949 sports events in the United Kingdom
1949 sports events in London